The Secret Life of 4 Year Olds is an Australian factual television series based on the British show, The Secret Life of 4 and 5 Year Olds. It premiered on Network Ten on Monday, 12 November at 7:30pm and shows once a week at 7:30pm on Mondays and shows an insight into what a four year old experiences in pre-school, over the period of five weeks.

Series Overview

References

Network 10 original programming
2018 Australian television series debuts
2018 Australian television series endings
Australian factual television series
English-language television shows
Television series by Screentime
Television series about children